The West Virginia Secondary School Activities Commission (WVSSAC, but colloquially referred to as SSAC) is the main governing body of high school sports, cheerleading, and marching bands in West Virginia, United States. For sports other than basketball schools are divided into three classes by total enrollment in grades 9-12: A (less than 450 students), AA (451-800 students), and AAA (more than 800 students), with schools re-classed every four years. Football, baseball, cheerleading, golf, softball, track, and volleyball are broken into these three classes. Soccer, Cross country, tennis, and wrestling are broken into two classes (AAA and AA/A combined). Swimming is one class only.  For basketball, schools are divided into four classes.  Schools have the option of playing "up" one class in a particular sport.

The organization began with boys' basketball championships in 1914. During the decades of segregated schools in West Virginia, it excluded schools for African American students. They competed in the West Virginia Athletic Union. The organization excluded private schools until 1979, when it merged with the state Catholic League. Today it also includes private schools of various religious viewpoints, along with all public schools in the state.

Unlike similar governing bodies in the United States, the WVSSAC does not dictate individual high school schedules during the regular season; those decisions are made by the coaches involved.  Note that the WVSSAC does set forth some basic guidelines (i.e., the number of schools within its own classification or higher that a school must compete against) for a school to be eligible for that sport's playoffs. The WVSSAC determines scheduling during the playoffs. For example, in football, whose playoffs are seeded on a statewide basis, each game is played at the higher-seeded school's campus if its stadium is approved by the SSAC to host playoff matches. Otherwise, it is played at the SSAC-approved venue nearest to the higher-seeded school. The lower-seeded school has the choice of one of three starting times — 7:30 pm on Friday or Saturday, or 1:30 pm on Saturday.

Activities
 Band
 Baseball  -  Appalachian Power Park Charleston
 Basketball - Charleston Civic Center Charleston
 Cheerleading - Charleston Civic Center Charleston
 Cross country Cabell Midland High School Ona
 Football (Super Six) - Wheeling Island Stadium - Wheeling 
 Golf (site changes from year to year)
 Soccer YMCA Beckley
 Softball Jackson Park Vienna
 Swimming West Virginia University Morgantown
 Tennis Watt Powell Tennis Annex and Player's Club Tennis Center Charleston
 Track Laidley Field Charleston
 Volleyball  Charleston Civic Center Charleston
 Wrestling  Big Sandy Superstore Arena Huntington

Controversies
Prior to the decision in Brown v. Board of Education, West Virginia maintained "colored" high schools.  These schools, and thus their students, were barred from competition in the WVSSAC.  The institution now known as West Virginia State University funded an unofficial "state colored championship" in basketball and football until 1959.  The WVSSAC historical records take no note of these champions, and does not note that its champions prior to that year competed in a system that excluded many of the state's best athletes.
  
West Virginia was one of only three states to hold girls' basketball in the fall, and girls' volleyball in the winter, ostensibly due to facility shortages at various high schools.  Eventually the West Virginia Supreme Court of Appeals ruled that this unfairly disadvantaged girls in competition for college scholarships and the organization was forced to adopt a traditional schedule.

There have also been complaints that the disparity of enrollment in Class AAA makes it difficult for the smaller schools in the classification to compete, particularly in football.  There is a 1032 student difference between Cabell Midland and Ripley, Cabell Midland being the largest and Ripley being the smallest schools in the class respectively.  On the other hand, there is only a 473 student difference between Ripley and the smallest Class AA school, Man. The last time a AAA school with an enrollment under 1000 students won a football championship was Nitro in 1998.  In the 2016 re-class the number of AAA schools was reduced in order to reduce the disparity in enrollment.

References

External links
 West Virginia Secondary School Activities Commission

Sports in West Virginia
Public education in West Virginia
High school sports associations in the United States